Fatih Mosque (from Turkish Fatih Camii, "Mosque of the Conquest") may refer to:

In Albania
 Fatih Mosque, Durrës
 Fatih Sultan Mehmet Mosque, Shkodër
In Austria
 Fatih Mosque, Vienna
In Bahrain
 Fatih Mosque, Manama
In Lebanon
 Fatih Mosque, Beirut
In Germany 
 Fatih Mosque, Bremen 
 Fatih Mosque, Heilbronn
 Fatih Mosque, Pforzheim
 Fatih Mosque, Stadtallendorf
In the Netherlands
 Fatih Mosque, Amsterdam
 Fatih Mosque, Eindhoven
 Fatih Mosque, Maastricht
In Saudi Arabia
 Fatih Mosque, Medina
In Switzerland
 Fatih Mosque, Zug
In Turkey
 Fatih Mosque, Istanbul
 Fatih Mosque, Tirilye, Bursa Province
 Fatih Mosque, Trabzon

See also 
 Fethiye Mosque (disambiguation)